The 2007 Nigerian Senate election in Zamfara State was held on 21 April 2007, to elect members of the Nigerian Senate to represent Zamfara State. Hassan Muhammed Gusau representing Zamfara Central, Sahabi Alhaji Yaú representing Zamfara North and Ahmad Sani Yerima representing Zamfara West all won on the platform of All Nigeria Peoples Party.

Overview

Summary

Results

Zamfara Central 
The election was won by Hassan Muhammed Gusau of the All Nigeria Peoples Party.

Zamfara West 
The election was won by Ahmad Sani Yerima of the All Nigeria Peoples Party.

Zamfara North 
The election was won by Sahabi Alhaji Yaú of the All Nigeria Peoples Party.

References 

April 2007 events in Nigeria
Zamfara State Senate elections
Zam